Kekkonen's second cabinet was the 34th government of Finland, which existed from 17 January 1951 to 20 September 1951. It was a majority government, and its Prime Minister was Urho Kekkonen.

Ministers  
There were 11 total ministers in Kekkonen's second cabinet: five (including Kekkonen himself) from the Agrarian League, four from the Social Democratic Party, one from both the Swedish People's Party and the National Progressive Party, and one independent. Additionally, 6 additional ministers served within various ministries: three from the Social Democratic Party, two from the Agrarian League, and one from the Swedish People's Party. Rafael Paasio served as a minister at both the Ministry of Social Affairs and the Ministry of Transport and Public Works.

Ministers

References

 

Kekkonen, 2
1951 establishments in Finland
1951 disestablishments in Finland
Cabinets established in 1951
Cabinets disestablished in 1951
Cabinet 2